Prauserella isguenensis is a halophilic bacterium from the genus Prauserella which has been isolated from desert soil in Algeria.

References

Pseudonocardiales
Bacteria described in 2015